Wiese may refer to:

Places

Modern day
 Wiese (Apfeldorf), a village in Apfeldorf, Landsberg am Lech, Bavaria, Germany
 Wiese (Märkische Heide), a village in Märkische Heide, Oder-Spree, Brandenburg, Germany
 Wiese (Much), a village in Much, Rhein-Sieg-Kreis, North Rhine-Westphalia, Germany
 Wiese Islands, an island group to the east of the Biscoe Islands of Antarctica
 Wiese Island, in the Arctic Ocean

Historic
 Louka u Litvínova, formerly Wiese, Czechia; a village and municipality in Ústí nad Labem Region, Czech Republic
 Wisznia Mała, formerly Wiese; a village in Trzebnicki, Lower Silesia Voivodship, Poland
 Barzyna, Warmian-Masurian Voivodeship, formerly Wiese; a village in Poland

Bodies of water
 Wiese (river), a tributary of the Rhine in southwest Germany and northwest Switzerland
 Little Wiese, a tributary of the Wiese (river)
 Köhlgartenwiese, a tributary of the Little Wiese; see Wiese (river)

People with the surname
Carina Wiese (born 1968), German actress
Christo Wiese (born 1941), South African businessman
David Wiese (born 1985), South African cricketer
Dirk Wiese (politician) (born 1983), German politician
 Hartwig Friedrich Wiese (1840–1905), German engineer, naturalist and antiquarian
Klaus Wiese (1942–2009), e-musician, minimalist, and multi-instrumentalist
Kobus Wiese (born 1964), South African rugby union player
Marli Wiese, American politician
Richard Wiese (born 1959), American explorer
Sydney Wiese (born 1995), American basketball player
Tim Wiese (born 1981), German professional wrestler and former football goalkeeper
Trygve Wiese (born 1985), Norwegian music producer and DJ

See also
 
 Wiesen (disambiguation)
 Wiesloch, a city in Germany
 Wise (disambiguation)